Villanova Canavese is a comune (municipality) in the Metropolitan City of Turin in the Italian region Piedmont, located about  northwest of Turin.  
Villanova Canavese borders the following municipalities: Mathi, Nole, Grosso, Cafasse, and Fiano.

References

Cities and towns in Piedmont